The Mayor of Newham was a position first established in 1965 with the creation of the London Borough of Newham. It replaced the mayors of East Ham and West Ham. A directly elected mayor of Newham was established in 2002 and the position was renamed as the civic ambassador. The office of Civic Ambassador was discontinued in 2009.

Mayor

1965 Terence Charles McMillan
1966 Alice Emma Gannon
1967 Arthur Frank George Edwards
1968 Abraham Wolffe
1969 Leonard John Simons
1970 Michael Davidson
1971 Edward Sylvester Charles Kebbell
1972 James Christopher Carter
1973 Joseph Charles Taylor
1974 Harry Bauckham
1975 Louis Arthur Wood
1976 Herbert Albert Taylor
1977 Constance Louise Bock
1978 Harold Edward Fitzsimons
1979 Marjorie Edith Helps
1980 Edward Daly
1981 Stanley Hopwood
1982 Julia Caroline Isabelle Garfield
1983 Herbert Thomas Philpott
1984 Charles Albert Flemwell
1985 Thomas Nolan
1986 Sir Jack Clow 
1987 Fredrick Ernest York
1988 James George Newstead
1989 Raymond Massey
1990 Sarah Louise Murray
1991 Amarjit Singh
1992 William Chapman
1993 Sarah Jean Reeves
1994 Maureen Knight
1995 William Henry Brown
1996 Shama Ahmed
1997 Victor Francis Turner
1998 Abdul Karim Sheikh
1999 Riaz Ahmed Mirza
2000 Bryan Collier
2001 Sukhdev Singh Marway

Civic Ambassador

2002 Marie Collier
2003 Joy Laguda
2004 Patricia Holland
2005 Maureen Jones
2006 Pearson Shillingford
2007 Omana Gangadharan
2008 Akbar Chaudhary

References

Politics of the London Borough of Newham
Newham